Hum TV HD is a 24-hour Urdu General Entertainment TV channel based in Karachi, Pakistan. It was founded by Sultana Siddiqui and Duraid Qureshi. It is owned by Hum Network Limited and traded on Pakistan Stock Exchange as (HUMNL).

Hum Network Limited was known as Eye Television Network Limited prior to 21 January 2011. Hum TV began its transmission on 17 January 2005. In March 2013, Hum Network held its first Hum Awards ceremony. As of 1 May 2018, Hum TV shut down its SD feed and is only  available in HD in Pakistan.

Hum TV is one of Pakistan's biggest entertainment networks and regularly is in top ranks and maintains a loyal fanbase on social media, streaming platforms, as well as on television.

History 

The channel's drama series Humsafar, broadcast in 2011–2012, has become the most successful program of the channel to date, earning it widespread acclaim and international recognition. Due to its success, critics referred to Pakistani television as a "Golden Age".

SD Closure
At the 1st Hum Awards ceremony it was awarded the Hum Honorary Phenomenal Serial Award. Hum TV caters to all genres from entertainment. While HUM caters to urban Pakistan, most dramas on Hum TV at the moment are skewed towards a teen/youth audience, with some other serials being aimed at a more mature urban audience.

Current programs 

Hum TV's programming has been known for shows like:

 Hum Tum
Suno Chanda
 Chupke Chupke.
Ehd-e-Wafa
Meer Abru
Dar Si Jaati Hai Sila
Dastaan
 Diyar-e-Dil
 "Dil e Muztar
 "Badshah Begum
 Durr-e-Shehwar
 Humsafar
 Ishq-e-Laa
 Ishq Zahe Naseeb
Mann Mayal
Inkaar
 Mata-e-Jaan Hai Tu
 O Rangreza
 Parizaad’’
 Pyar Ke Sadqay Ranjha Ranjha Kardi Sang-e-MahShehr-e-ZaatUdaariUllu Baraye Farokht NahiYaqeen Ka Safar 
Ye Raha Dil
 Zindagi Gulzar Hai''

Production House

MD Productions
The network television serials are primarily produced under production company Momina Duraid Productions or MD Productions, owned by Momina Duraid wife of Siddiqui's youngest Son Duraid Qureshi and she is also a senior producer at channel.

Moomal Entertainment
The other Hum TV shows are being produced by Moomal Entertainment owned by Moomal Shunaid, wife of Siddiqui's eldest son Shunaid Siddiqui. Moomal Entertainment was founded in 2014.

Hum Network channels
 Hum TV
HUM Sitaray
HUM Masala (food and cooking channel)
HUM World with separate beams for North America, the United Kingdom and the Middle East

See also
 List of Pakistani television series
 List of television channels in Pakistan
 Hum Masala (food and cooking channel)
 Style 360
 Hum Sitaray
 Hum Europe
 Hum World
 Hum Films
 Hum Award
 List of programs broadcast by Hum TV

References

External links

 
Television stations in Pakistan
Television stations in Karachi
Television channels and stations established in 2005
Hum Network Limited